Joseph Elmer Ritter (July 20, 1892 – June 10, 1967) was an American prelate of the Roman Catholic Church. He served as archbishop of the Archdiocese of St. Louis in Missouri from 1946 until his death in 1967, and was created a cardinal in 1961. He previously served as auxiliary bishop (1933–1934) and bishop (later archbishop) (1934–1946) of the Archdiocese of Indianapolis in Indiana. Ritter was one of the cardinals elector who participated at the Papal Conclave,1963.

Ritter is noted for ending racial discrimination in church schools in both of his archdioceses long before it became mandatory in the United States.  He also ended hospital segregation in the archdiocese of St. Louis, and supported the education of African-American students.

Early life and education
Born July 20, 1892, in New Albany, Indiana, Elmer Joseph Ritter was the fourth of Nicholas (1859–1944) and Bertha (née Luette) (1865–1941) Ritter's six children. His father owned and operated the Ritter Bakery (where the family also lived). Both of Ritter's parents were of German descent. As a 1946 newspaper article said "It was one of those shops, now rare, in which the whole family, the mother, father and the whole family had to help, either in the store part, which was in the front, or in the bakery which was in the rear."

Ritter said his father had a great reverence of education, saying, "Dad gave us all a chance to go to college, but only if we applied ourselves."Ritter received his early education at the parochial school of St. Mary of the Annunciation Church in New Albany where he was called "Apple-Pie Ritter".

Religious calling
During the seventh grade, Ritter decided to enter the priesthood. Ritter said "There was no vision, no voice from heaven. I simply wanted to be a priest." In 1907, he enrolled at St. Meinrad's Seminary in Saint Meinrad, Indiana, where he completed his studies in 1917.

Priesthood
Ritter was ordained to the priesthood at the St. Meinrad Seminary's Abbey Church on May 30, 1917, by Bishop Joseph Chartrand. His first assignment was as a curate at St. Patrick's Parish in Indianapolis. Shortly afterwards, he was transferred to Saints Peter and Paul Cathedral Parish, also in Indianapolis where he served as assistant to the bishop in 1920 and rector of the cathedral in 1925 to 1933. In 1922, Ritter received an honorary doctorate of theology from Pope Pius XI.

Indianapolis years
On February 3, 1933, Ritter was appointed as auxiliary bishop of what was then the Diocese of Indianapolis and titular bishop of Hippos by Pius XI. He received his episcopal consecration on March 28, 1933, from Bishop Chartrand, with Bishops Alphonse Smith and Emmanuel Ledvina serving as co-consecrators. As an auxiliary bishop, he also served as vicar general of the diocese from 1933 to 1934. At age 40, Ritter was one of the youngest Catholic bishops in the United States.

Following the death of Bishop Chartrand, Ritter was appointed the seventh bishop of the Diocese of Indianapolis on March 24, 1934. In 1938, he directed an end to racial segregation in all Catholic schools in the diocese. His decision, made 16 years before Brown v. Board of Education, was met with opposition by the Ku Klux Klan, whose members protested outside of SS. Peter and Paul Cathedral, and even by his fellow members of the clergy. Ritter also reorganized the diocesan Catholic Charities, introduced the Catholic Youth Organization, and completed the construction of SS. Peter and Paul Cathedral. He reduced the diocese's debt by $3 million, . Ritter also reorganized the Catholic Charities in the diocese.

In 1941, Ritter opened St. John's Parish in Evansville, Indiana, the first Black Catholic parish in the city. The Diocese of Indianapolis was elevated to the status of an archdiocese by Pope Pius XII on October 21, 1944, and Ritter was installed as its first archbishop on December 19, 1944.

St. Louis years
Ritter was appointed the fourth archbishop of the Archdiocese of St. Louis by Pius XII on July 20, 1946, succeeding the late Cardinal John J. Glennon.

St. Louis grew quickly during the post-World War II economic boom. Ritter opened an average of three parishes per year in St. Louis city and county. An able administrator, without the authority to tax or compel, Ritter nevertheless raised more than $125,000,000 to build sixty new parishes, sixteen high schools, and the Cardinal Glennon Memorial Hospital for Children in St. Louis during his tenure there.

Desegregation efforts
As one of his first acts as archbishop, Ritter announced that Webster College would accept black students, endorsing the Sisters of Loretto's wish to enroll black women in their Webster College (which Ritter's predecessor, Archbishop Glennon, had ruled impossible).He also allowed the senior class of St. Joseph's High School, then the city's only black Catholic high school, to graduate for the first time at the Cathedral alongside white Catholic high school students.

Desegregated diocesan schools and hospitals
On August 9, 1947, Ritter announced an end to racial segregation in all five St. Louis diocesan high schools before the fall term. He declared, "The cross on top of our schools must mean something," and expressed his belief in "the equality of every soul before Almighty God". Ritter sent a memo to all parish school superintendents, saying they must begin to "accept all children into parish schools without regard to race". In one stroke, Ritter had desegregated the Catholic St. Louis area schools, seven years before the 1954 US Supreme Court's Brown vs Board of Education decision. The parochial schools represented one-quarter of all St. Louis area students.

In response to Ritter's desegregation order, a group of over 700 white Catholics from 49 St. Louis area parishes, calling themselves the "Catholic Parents Association of Saint Louis and Saint Louis County", threatened to sue him.  The association claimed that his order violated  Missouri state law. Association Co-Chair William T. Rone said "We do not want Negro children alongside our children in the schools." Ritter refused to meet with the association leaders, his spokesman saying, "He is the father of the whole flock and must care for all, regardless of race."Ritter then issued a pastoral letter in which he warned of possible excommunication for "interfering with ecclesiastical office authority by having recourse to authority outside of the church". 

While the association rejected any civil action, it did send a letter of protest to the apostolic delegate to the United States, Amleto Giovanni Cicognani. Cicognani responded to the letter by saying "I am confident that everyone will readily comply with what has been so clearly proposed by the ecclesiastical authority of the Archdiocese".Ritter also desegregated all Catholic hospitals in the St. Louis archdiocese.

Fundraising
Ritter also developed what is now known as the Annual Catholic Appeal, which remains a primary source of financial support for many archdiocesan educational and charitable activities.

Ecumenism
On August 24, 1964, at Kiel Auditorium in St. Louis, Ritter celebrated the world's first authorized Mass in English.

Ritter also forbade Catholics to see the 1954 film The French Line under danger of serious sin.  The film featured actor Jane Russell dancing in a scanty outfit in what was then considered a sexually-suggestive scene. He declared that Catholic students must get written permission from the archdiocese to attend secular or non-Catholic colleges. Ritter was one of the first bishops to create a diocesan mission, specifically in La Paz, Bolivia. Until that time, most Catholic missions had been run by religious institutes or societies of apostolic life. Parishioners in St. Louis regularly contributed more money to these foreign missions than any archdiocese of its size. Ritter served as president of the National Catholic Educational Association from 1955 to 1956, and was named an assistant at the pontifical throne on October 5, 1956.

Cardinal
Ritter was created cardinal priest of SS. Redentore e S. Alfonso in Via Merulana by Pope John XXIII in the consistory of January 16, 1961. Between 1962 and 1965, he participated in all four sessions of the Second Vatican Council in Rome. Ritter was viewed as a liberal. He also protested against the Roman Curia's oppressive actions and Cardinal Alfredo Ottaviani's draft on the sources of revelation at the Council.

Death, funeral and burial
Ritter died on June 10, 1967, at DePaul Hospital in St. Louis after suffering two heart attacks earlier in the week. His body lay in state at the  Cathedral.

Funeral
Ritter's requiem mass was celebrated on June 15, 1967, at St. Louis cathedral. At his request, it was a "Low Funeral Mass".  Cardinal-designate John Patrick Cody, archbishop of Chicago, formerly an auxiliary bishop under the late cardinal in St. Louis, was the main celebrant. Cardinals Richard Cushing, James Francis McIntyre, Lawrence Shehan, and Francis Spellman attended, together with cardinals-designate John Krol and Patrick O'Boyle. Ten archbishops, forty-eight bishops, and four abbots were also in attendance. Some fifty Protestant, Jewish, and Orthodox Christina leaders were present, representing the Episcopal Church, Missouri-Synod Lutheran, United Church of Christ, Greek Orthodox, Baptist, Disciples of Christ, Methodists, Presbyterians, and Salvation Army. In his sermon, Kansas City Bishop Charles Helmsing, another auxiliary bishop who had served under Ritter, spoke of Ritter's liturgical leadership, particularly "his concern for a liturgy of the Word that would truly inform and enlighten the people of God."

Burial and re-interment
Ritter was buried in the priest's lot at Calvary Cemetery in St. Louis. He had said he did not want to be buried in the cathedral.On November 2, 1994, Archbishop Justin Rigali of St. Louis had Ritter's remains removed from Calvary Cemetery and re-interred in the crypt of the new cathedral, now the cathedral basilica of St. Louis.

Legacy

Ritter is commemorated by a mosaic tile depiction in the Cathedral Basilica of Saint Louis showing him reaching out toward a group of people from other faiths on one side, and also an integrated group of school children on the other.
Ritter was a friend of Lionel Hampton and Cardinal Ottaviani.
In a gesture of ecumenism, Ritter granted his approval to the mixed marriage of a Catholic and an Episcopalian in 1964. He also authorized the first English Mass in the United States.
Ritter, intensely dedicated to racial equality, even withheld communion from Catholics who practiced discrimination.
Ritter was "dismayed" and "indignant" after the rector of Catholic University of America, Monsignor William McDonald, refused to allow certain liberal theologians to speak at the university.
His birthplace and childhood home in New Albany, Indiana, was to be turned into a museum about Ritter's life (he remains the only Indiana-born Cardinal in the Catholic Church's history, and up until October 2016, when Pope Francis named Indianapolis's incumbent Archbishop, Joseph William Tobin, to the cardinalate [effective in November 2016], Indianapolis- or any other Indiana diocese- was not a cardinalatial see) in three stages. The Cardinal Ritter Birthplace Foundation is promoting this project. The museum will occupy the Ritter family's bakery—its storefront was part of the 1874 Queen Anne-style home.
A one-hour documentary of Ritter's life was filmed.
Cardinal Ritter High School in Indianapolis is named in his honor.
Cardinal Ritter College Prep High School in St. Louis is named in his honor.

Honors
 Ritter received an honorary Doctorate of Theology from Pope Pius XI in 1922.
 In 1961, Saint Louis University named Ritter an honorary “Founder of Saint Louis University" "in honor of his leadership and influence in the cause of education".
 Ritter was unanimously chosen 1965 "Ecumenical Man of the Year" by the Metropolitan St. Louis Church Federation. Ritter declined the award, saying "Grateful for the honor, I am united with you in efforts for Christian unity. But it is my practice to decline citations in line with what is obviously my duty".
 Ritter was awarded an honorary Doctor of Divinity degree by Eden Theological Seminary, St. Louis, Missouri, 1965.

See also
Cardinal electors in Papal conclave, 1963

References

External links
Archdiocese of Saint Louis
Cardinals of the Holy Roman Church

Roman Catholic bishops of Indianapolis
1892 births
1967 deaths
20th-century American cardinals
American people of German descent
Roman Catholic archbishops of Indianapolis
Roman Catholic archbishops of St. Louis
Participants in the Second Vatican Council
People from New Albany, Indiana
People from Indianapolis
Burials at the Cathedral Basilica of Saint Louis (St. Louis)
Cardinals created by Pope John XXIII
African-American Roman Catholicism